RoseMatta rice (also known as Palakkadan/Kerala Matta rice, or Kaje Rice in Karnataka) (Tulu:കജെ അരി) is an indigenous variety of rice grown in Udupi, Dakshina Kannada districts of Karnataka, and Palakkad district of Kerala, India. It is known for its coarseness and health benefits. It is popular in Kerala and coastal Karnataka in India and Sri Lanka where it is used on a regular basis for idlies, appams and plain rice; it is different from brown rice. The robust and earthy flavour of Red Matta makes it suitable to accompany lamb, beef or game meats.

Origin
Palakkadan matta rice was the choice of the royal families of Chola and Chera dynasties of India.

Kerala matta rice has been historically popular due to its rich and unique taste. It is used in preparations of rice-snacks like Kondattam, Murukku etc. References to chunnila matta can be found in the work Rice in Kerala authored by Sri. P.C. Sahadevan and published by the Government of Kerala in 1966. The rice is mentioned in Tamil classics such as Thirukkural. Rice in the days of the Chera/Chola kingdoms was considered a royal food.

Cultivation and trade
Kerala matta rice is grown in Kerala and Karnataka in southern India. Matta rice gives Kerala farmers a premium of Rs. 300 for 500 kg of paddy. A three-year ban on the export of matta rice was partially lifted in February 2011, allowing 25,000 tonnes to be exported in 2011.

Palakkadan matta rice is cultivated in the dense black cotton soil of Palakkad district in Kerala.  The rice has a distinct earthly flavour because of the type of soil in which it is cultivated.  These paddy fields are called 'poonthalpadam' and the soil contains a lot of clay and silt.  Because of these qualities, this kind of paddy fields can retain more water.

Characteristics
The grains are yellowish pink (from being parboiled) with reddish outer layers. Rose matta rice maintains its pink hue as well as its flavour on cooking. Like all brown or parboiled rice, red matta has a lengthy cooking time and requires extra water.

Uniqueness
Palakkadan matta rice is registered under the Geographical Indications of Goods (Registration & Protection) Act, 1999 by the Palakkad Matta Farmers Producer Company Ltd. It is a coarse variety of rice with bold grains and red pericarp. The rice has a unique taste. The coarse rice with red pericarp by itself ensures high content of nutrients. Par-boiling of the rice further ensures retention of nutritional value. The grains are grown on unique black cotton or regar soil, derived from rocks rich in lime peculiar to Palakkad, also in Poonthalpadam where the soil is heavy, containing 60–80% of clay and silt and possess low permeability and high water holding capacity. These soils, the humid weather of Palakkad, easterly winds that blow through the Palakkad gap and the rivers that flow from the Western Ghats.

Preparation
Parboiled rice is harder than white rice and needs some thirty minutes of soaking before cooking.

Matta rice is traditionally double cooked.

The rice is washed in a large pan and left to soak from 1 hour to overnight. The rice is drained and simmered with 4 to 8 parts water for 30 minutes. It is then covered and left for 15–20 minutes. The rice is then salted and boiled for another 15–20 minutes or until cooked. It is finally drained and left covered for a further 10–15 minutes before serving..Easy way is boil water and put rice for 25 minutes it will cook then drain the leftover water.

Quality
Paddy is thoroughly cleaned and destoned prior to boiling and drying process. Final finished rice is graded for removing brokens and again colour sorted in computerised sorting machines and well packed.

Nutrition benefits
Palakkadan Matta rice is more nutritious than white polished rice because parboiling before milling retains some nutrients.  One serving cup of 1/4 size can contain 160 calories and 1 gram of fibre. White rice doesn't contain any fibre. The brown outer layer of the Matta rice contains many nutrients and white rice is made by polishing away this valuable layer.  One cup of Matta rice can contain 84 milligrams of magnesium and one gram of calcium. It also contains vitamins.

E-commerce application by farmers 
Some farms have adopted technology to ship matta rice from the farm to customers.

Personalisation 
An agrarian family in Palakkad introduced a smartphone application to order personalised matta rice. The application allows customers to choose the bran content of the rice that they order.

Adulteration
A serious health hazard is the wide availability of artificially colored matta rice.  The color added for this purpose can be harmful to the body. There are complaints that such varieties are widely distributed through the subsidized public distribution systems on which the poor depend heavily.

See also
 Sadhya – a dish in Kerala cuisine sometimes prepared using matta rice
Nanjanagud banana
Coorg orange
Coorg Green Cardamom

References

Rice varieties
Kerala cuisine
Culture of Palakkad district
Geographical indications in Kerala
Agriculture in Kerala